Dontrell Donmond Hilliard (born February 26, 1995) is an American football running back and return specialist for the Tennessee Titans of the National Football League (NFL). He played college football at Tulane and signed as an undrafted free agent with the Cleveland Browns in 2018.

Early years
Hilliard attended and played high school football at Scotlandville Magnet High School. He received offers from Tulane and Oklahoma State before committing to the Green Wave.

College career

While at Tulane, Hilliard rushed for 2,948 yards and 30 touchdowns and caught 70 passes for 740 yards and four touchdowns over the course of four seasons (47 games). As a senior, Hilliard was third in the American Athletic Conference with 1,091 rushing yards and rushed for 12 touchdowns and was named second-team All-AAC.

Professional career

Cleveland Browns
Hilliard signed with the Cleveland Browns as an undrafted free agent on May 4, 2018. Hilliard was signed to the Browns practice squad on September 2, 2018, after not making the 53-man roster out of training camp. Hilliard was promoted to the Browns' active roster on October 9, 2018. Hilliard made his NFL debut on October 14 against the Los Angeles Chargers, returning one kick for 31 yards and recording a tackle on special teams. In his rookie season, Hilliard caught nine passes for 105 yards and returned 11 kicks for 264 yards (24.0 average), as well as making three tackles on special teams, in 11 games played.

During the 2019 season-opening 43-13 loss to the Tennessee Titans, Hilliard scored his first touchdown on a four-yard run, the first carry of his professional career. He was placed on injured reserve on December 24, 2019. He recorded 13 carries for 49 yards and two touchdowns to go along with 12 receptions for 92 yards and led the team with 421 kickoff return yards and 107 punt return yards in 14 games.

Hilliard was tendered by the Browns for the 2020 season. He was placed on the reserve/COVID-19 list on July 26, 2020, and activated from the list nine days later. He was waived on September 5, 2020. The Browns re-signed Hilliard to their practice squad on September 6, 2020. He was promoted to the active roster on September 30, 2020. Hilliard was waived by the Browns on December 13, 2020.

Houston Texans
On December 15, 2020, Hilliard was claimed off waivers by the Houston Texans. He signed a contract extension with the team on March 1, 2021, which was reported by Ian Rapoport of NFL Network as a one-year, $1.25 million extension. On August 16, 2021, he was waived with an injury designation by the Texans and placed on injured reserve. He was released on August 19.

Tennessee Titans
On October 27, 2021, Hilliard was signed to the Tennessee Titans practice squad. After being elevated to the active roster, he rushed for 35 yards on seven carries, caught eight passes for 47 yards, and returned three kickoffs for 65 yards against the Houston Texans in Week 11. After the game, he reverted back to practice squad.  On November 23, 2021, the Titans signed Hilliard to the active roster. In a 36-13 Week 12 loss to the New England Patriots, Hilliard rushed 12 times for 131 yards and a touchdown. Both Hilliard and fellow running back D'Onta Foreman rushed for over 100 yards in that game, the first time the Titans had two 100-yard rushers in a single game since Chris Johnson and LenDale White in 2008. Overall, Hilliard finished the 2021 season with 56 carries for 350 rushing yard and two touchdowns in eight games.

On March 19, 2022, Hilliard re-signed with the Titans. He was placed on injured reserve on December 17, 2022.

NFL career statistics

Regular season

References

External links
Tennessee Titans bio
Tulane Green Wave bio

1995 births
Living people
Players of American football from Baton Rouge, Louisiana
American football running backs
Tulane Green Wave football players
Cleveland Browns players
Houston Texans players
Tennessee Titans players